The Guess Who are a Canadian rock band, originating as Chad Allan and the Reflections in 1962, and adopting the name The Guess Who in 1965. They were most successful from 1968 to 1975, under the leadership of singer/keyboardist Burton Cummings. During that period they released eleven studio albums, all of which reached the charts in Canada and the United States; their 1970 album American Woman reached no. 1 in Canada and no. 9 in the United States, and five other albums reached the top ten in Canada. They also achieved five number one singles in Canada and two in the United States.

The band experienced many lineup changes. During the 1968-1975 classic era, Cummings and drummer Garry Peterson were the only consistent members; they were joined by five guitarists and two bassists during those years. Cummings ended the band in 1975 and embarked on a solo career. In the following decades, Cummings and original guitarist Randy Bachman led several one-time reunion shows or short commemorative tours with various former members.

Simultaneously, original bassist Jim Kale led semi-continuous lineups on nostalgia tours with a frequently changing cast of lesser-known sidemen. On some occasions Kale departed temporarily and various entities named The Guess Who performed with no original members. Peterson appeared in both sequences of reunion tours. Kale retired in 2016, and Peterson (the final remaining original member) continues to lead a lineup using the name The Guess Who to the present day.

This list article does not include musicians who filled in temporarily for official members.

Original members (1965-1975)

Classic line-up

Former members

Nostalgia tour members (1977-present)

Current members

Former members

Timelines

Early and classic era timeline

Timeline of reunions and nostalgia tours

Lineups

The Guess Who

Bachman/Cummings-led reunions

Kale-led and other reunions

References

The Guess Who members